The 1997 WNBA season was the inaugural season for the Sacramento Monarchs.

Offseason

Initial Player Allocation

WNBA Elite Draft

WNBA Draft

Regular season

Season standings

Season schedule

Player stats
Ruthie Bolton ranked second in the WNBA in points with 447 points.
Ruthie Bolton ranked third in the WNBA in field goals with 164.
Ruthie Bolton ranked fourth in the WNBA in Minutes per game with 35.3
Ruthie Bolton ranked second in the WNBA in points per game with 19.4
Ruthie Bolton was tied for sixth in the WNBA in steals with 54.
Latasha Byears ranked fifth in the WNBA in total rebounds with 193
Latasha Byears ranked ninth in the WNBA in Field Goal Percentage (.459)
Bridgette Gordon ranked first in the WNBA in Minutes per game with 35.0
Bridgette Gordon ranked ninth in the WNBA in Free Throw Pct with .785
Pamela McGee ranked eighth in the WNBA in Field Goal Percentage (.460)
Chantel Tremitiere was tied for sixth in the WNBA in steals with 54.
Chantel Tremitiere ranked first in the WNBA in Minutes per game with 37.5

Awards and honors
Ruthie Bolton: Led WNBA, 3-Pt Field Goal Attempts, 192
Ruthie Bolton: Second in WNBA, 3-Pt Field Goals, 66
Latasha Byears: Led WNBA, Offensive Rebounds, 87
Chantel Tremitiere: Led WNBA, Minutes Played 1051
Chantel Tremitiere: Led WNBA, Turnovers, 122
Chantel Tremitiere: Led WNBA, Minutes per game, 37.5

References

External links
Monarchs on Basketball Reference

Sacramento
Sacramento Monarchs seasons
Sacramento Monarchs